Gregor Bajde (born 29 April 1994) is a Slovenian footballer who plays for Celje as a winger.

Honours
Maribor
Slovenian Championship: 2016–17, 2018–19
Slovenian Cup: 2015–16

References

External links
NZS profile 

1994 births
Living people
Slovenian footballers
Association football wingers
Association football forwards
NK IB 1975 Ljubljana players
NK Celje players
NK Bravo players
NK Maribor players
Novara F.C. players
Slovenian Second League players
Slovenian PrvaLiga players
Serie B players
Slovenian expatriate footballers
Slovenian expatriate sportspeople in Italy
Expatriate footballers in Italy
Slovenia youth international footballers
Slovenia under-21 international footballers